Yana Tunyantse (born 29 October 1972) is a Kazakhstani archer. She competed in the women's individual and team events at the 1996 Summer Olympics.

References

External links
 

1972 births
Living people
Kazakhstani female archers
Olympic archers of Kazakhstan
Archers at the 1996 Summer Olympics
Place of birth missing (living people)
Archers at the 1994 Asian Games
Asian Games competitors for Kazakhstan
20th-century Kazakhstani women